The State Duma of the Federal Assembly of the Russian Federation of the 4th convocation (Russian: Государственная Дума Федерального Собрания Российской Федерации IV созыва) is a former convocation of the legislative branch of the State Duma, Lower House of the Russian Parliament. The 4th convocation met chiefly at the State Duma building in Moscow (however, several meetings took place at the Tauride Palace in St. Petersburg); it worked from December 7, 2003 to December 24, 2007.

The 4th State Duma's composition was based upon the results of the 2003 parliamentary election. Of the twenty–four parties participating in the elections, only four were able to overcome the 5% election threshold to gain representation based upon the proportional representation system and another party was held in the State Duma by winning a few electoral districts.

Leadership

The first meeting of the State Duma traditionally held oldest deputy – 80 year-old of Valentin Varennikov.

On December 29, 2003, the parliament elected Boris Gryzlov as the Chairman of the State Duma.

First Deputy Chairman elected: Lyubov Sliska and Alexander Zhukov.

Deputy Chairman elected: Georgy Boos (before September 21, 2005), Yuri Volkov (since September 21, 2005), Artur Chilingarov, Vyacheslav Volodin, Vladimir Pekhtin, Oleg Morozov, Valentin Kuptsov, Dmitry Rogozin and Vladimir Zhirinovsky.

Factions

Major legislation

March 5, 2004: Mikhail Fradkov approved as Prime Minister of Russia with 352 votes in favor.
May 12, 2004: Mikhail Fradkov re-approved as Prime Minister of Russia with 356 votes in favor.
December 3, 2004: A law on the abolition of the direct election of regional heads with 358 votes in favor.
September 14, 2007: Viktor Zubkov approved as Prime Minister of Russia with 381 votes in favor.

Committees

In the State Duma of the 4th convocation operated 28 Committees.

Committee on Constitutional Legislation and State Building
Committee on Civil, Criminal, Arbitration and Procedural Law
Veterans Affairs Committee
Committee of Labour and Social Policy
Budget and Tax Committee
Committee on Credit Organizations and Financial Markets
Committee on Economic Policy, Entrepreneurship and Tourism
Committee on Property Issues
Information Policy Committee
Committee on Energy, Transport and Communications
Committee on Industry, Construction and High Technology
Education and Science Committee
Committee on Culture
Committee on Physical Culture, Sport and Youth Affairs
Health Protection Committee
Committee on Women, Family and Children
Committee on Agrarian Issues
Defence Committee
Safety Committee
Committee on International Affairs
Committee on Commonwealth of Independent States Affairs and Relations with Compatriots
Committee on Rules and Organization of the State Duma
Committee on the problems of the North and Far East
Committee on Federation Affairs and Regional Policy 
Committee on Local Government 
The Environmental Committee
Committee on Natural Resources and the Environment
Committee on Public Associations and Religious Organizations
Committee for Nationalities

References

Convocations of the Russian State Duma
4th State Duma of the Russian Federation